Government in Tasmania is delivered by a number of agencies, grouped under areas of portfolio responsibility. Each portfolio is led by a government minister who is a member of the Parliament of Tasmania, appointed by the Governor as the representative of the Crown.

The agencies are principally grouped as eight departments, each led by a secretary or director-general and comprising a number of portfolios covering specific policy areas across the department and allocated statutory authorities, trading enterprises, boards, councils and other public bodies.

Agencies have varying levels of operational autonomy, and deliver one or more of frontline public services, administrative functions and law enforcement. Some are structured as for-profit corporations. Where there are multiple portfolios within a department, directors-general may be accountable to a number of ministers.

All agencies are identifiable by their corporate logo, which features in agency advertising, publications and correspondence, pictured right.

A list of articles on Tasmanian government agencies sorted alphabetically is available at Government agencies of Tasmania. The Tasmanian government maintains a list of agencies and their contact details at its website.

Education
The Department of Education (DoE) is the lead agency of the portfolio headed by the Minister for Education and Training, presently the Hon. Jeremy Rockliff MP.

The department is led by its secretary, Jenny Gale.

The Department of Education is responsible for the following statutory and non-statutory bodies:

 Allport Library and Museum of Fine Arts Management Committee
 Schools Registration Board
 Skills Tasmania
 State Library and Archives Trust
 Tasmanian Aboriginal Corporation for Education (TACE)
 Tasmanian Assessment, Standards and Certification (TASC)
 Tasmanian Building and Construction Industry Training Board
 Tasmanian Home Education Advisory Council
 Tasmanian Institute of Agriculture
 Tasmanian Library Advisory Board
 Teachers Registration Board
 University of Tasmania Council

Health and Human Services
The Department of Health and Human Services (DHHS) is the lead agency of the portfolio headed by the Minister for Health, presently the Hon. Michael Ferguson MP; supported by the Minister for Human Services and the Minister for Women, presently the Hon. Jacquie Petrusma MP.

The department is led by its secretary, currently acting in the role, Michael Pervan.

The Department of Health and Human Services is responsible for the following statutory and non-statutory bodies:
Ambulance Tasmania
Housing Tasmania
Tasmanian Health Service

Justice
The Department of Justice (DoJ) is the lead agency of the portfolio headed by the Attorney-General, the Minister for Justice, and the Minister for Corrections, presently the Hon. Vanessa Goodwin MLC; and the Minister for Planning and Local Government and the Minister for Building and Construction, presently the Hon. Peter Gutwein MP.

The department is led by its secretary, Kathrine Morgan-Wicks.

The Department of Justice is responsible for the following statutory and non-statutory bodies:

Anti-Discrimination Tribunal
Asbestos Compensation Tribunal
Coroners Court of Tasmania
Equal Opportunity Tasmania
Forest Practices Tribunal
Guardianship & Administration Board
Health Practitioners Tribunal
Legal Aid Commission
Magistrates' Court of Tasmania
Mental Health Tribunal
Office of the Public Guardian
Resource Management & Planning Appeal Tribunal
Supreme Court of Tasmania
Tasmanian Electoral Commission
Tasmanian Industrial Commission
Tasmanian Planning Commission
Tasmania Prison Service
Workers Rehabilitation & Compensation Tribunal
WorkSafe Tasmania

Police, Fire and Emergency Management
The Department of Police, Fire and Emergency Management (DPFEM) is the lead agency of the portfolio headed by the Minister for Police and Emergency Management, presently the Hon. Rene Hidding MP. The department does not have a lead secretary, with each agency reporting directly to the Minister.

The Department of Police, Fire and Emergency Management is responsible for the following statutory and non-statutory bodies:
Forensic Science Service Tas
Tasmania Fire Service
Tasmania Police
Tasmania State Emergency Service

Premier and Cabinet
The Department of Premier and Cabinet (DPAC) is the central agency of the Tasmanian Government. The department provides a broad range of services to Cabinet, other members of Parliament, Government agencies and the community. DPAC is headed by the Premier, the Minister for Sport and Recreation, and the Minister for Aboriginal Affairs, presently the Hon. Will Hodgman MP; supported by the Parliamentary Secretary to the premier, presently Guy Barnett MP; the Minister for Planning and Local Government, presently the Hon. Peter Gutwein MP; the Minister for Environment, Parks and Heritage, presently the Hon. Matthew Groom MP; the Minister for Information Technology and Innovation, presently the Hon. Michael Ferguson MP; and the Minister for Women, presently the Hon. Jacquie Petrusma MP.

The department is led by its secretary, Jenny Gale.

Primary Industries, Parks, Water and Environment
The Department of Primary Industries, Parks, Water and the Environment (DPIPWE) is the lead agency of the portfolio headed by the Minister for Primary Industries and Water, and the Minister for Racing, presently the Hon. Jeremy Rockliff MP; supported by the Minister for Environment, Parks and Heritage, presently the Hon. Matthew Groom MP.

The department is led by its secretary, John Whittington.

The Department of Primary Industries, Parks, Water and the Environment is responsible for the following statutory and non-statutory bodies:

Aboriginal Heritage Tasmania
AgriGrowth Tasmania
Biosecurity Tasmania
Environment Protection Authority Division
Heritage Tasmania
Inland Fisheries Service
Office of Racing Integrity
Royal Tasmanian Botanical Gardens
Tasmania Parks and Wildlife Service
Water & Marine Resources

State Growth
The Department of State Growth is the lead agency of the portfolio headed by the Minister for State Growth and the Minister for Energy, presently the Hon. Matthew Groom MP; supported by the Minister for Tourism, Hospitality and Events, presently the Hon. Will Hodgman MP; the Minister for Information Technology and Innovation, presently the Hon. Michael Ferguson MP; the Minister for the Arts, presently the Hon. Dr Vanessa Goodwin MLC; the Minister for Planning and Local Government, the Minister for Forestry, and the Minister for Building and Construction, presently the Hon. Peter Gutwein MP; the Minister for Infrastructure and the Minister for Mining, presently the Hon. Rene Hidding MP; and the Parliamentary Secretary for Small Business, presently the Hon. Guy Barnett MP.

The department is led by its secretary, Kim Evans.

The Department of State Growth is responsible for the following statutory and non-statutory bodies:

 Antarctic Tasmania
 Arts Tasmania
 Business Tasmania
 Events Tasmania
 Forest Practices Authority
 Forestry Tasmania
 Hydro Tasmania
 Infrastructure Tasmania
 Metro Tasmania
 Mineral Resources Tasmania
 Office of the Coordinator-General
 Private Forests Tasmania
 Racing Services Tasmania
 Screen Tasmania
 Skills Tasmania
 Tasmanian Development Board
 Tasmanian Institute of Sport
 TasRail
 Tasmanian Museum and Art Gallery
 Tourism Tasmania
 TT-Line Company
West Coast Wilderness Railway

Treasury and Finance
The Department of Treasury and Finance is the lead agency of the portfolio headed by the Treasurer, presently  the Hon. Peter Gutwein MP.

The department is led by its secretary, Tony Ferrall.

The Department of Treasury and Finance is responsible for the following statutory and non-statutory bodies:

Office of the Tasmanian Economic Regulator
Retirement Benefits Fund
State Grants Commission
Tasmanian Liquor and Gaming Commission
Tasmanian Public Finance Corporation (Tascorp)

See also

 Government of Tasmania
 Local government in Tasmania

References

 *
Lists of government agencies in Australia
Government agencies